Arkansas Highway 197 (AR 197, Ark. 197, and Hwy. 197) is the designation for a state highway in the U.S. state of Arkansas. The route is split into three sections, all of which are located in western Arkansas. The first and longest section begins at AR 22 in Subiaco, and ends near Lake Dardanelle southwest of Tokalon. The second section begins at AR 22 in New Blaine, and ends just south of Shoal Bay. All three signed highways are located within Logan County.

Route description

Section 1 

The first and longest section begins at AR 22 in Subiaco. The route heads towards the north, before taking a sharp turn towards the east near Wilkins, right at the intersection of AR 393. The route heads more in a northeasterly direction for about  before entering the town of Scranton, and intersecting AR 109. The route continues east for about  before reaching its northern terminus near Lake Dardanelle.

Section 2 

The second section begins at AR 22 in New Blaine. The southern section of AR 197 around New Blaine is a former alignment of AR 22, and is still used as a primary road to access the town center. AR 197 breaks off of the former AR 22 alignment just east of the town center, heading north. The route does not intersect any other signed highways or communities.

Section 3 

A third section of AR 197 can be found in Booneville.

Major intersections

References 

197
Transportation in Logan County, Arkansas